Ginger Snaps Back: The Beginning is a 2004 Canadian horror film and a prequel to Ginger Snaps and Ginger Snaps 2: Unleashed. The third and final installment in the Ginger Snaps series takes place in 19th century Canada, following the ancestors of the Fitzgerald sisters of the two previous films: Ginger (Katharine Isabelle) and Brigitte (Emily Perkins), who are identical in all respects to their modern-day counterparts.

Plot
Each spring, a party from a fort travels to Hudson Bay to trade pelts for winter provisions, but, in 1815, nobody returns.

Brigitte and Ginger Fitzgerald are lost with their horse in the Canadian wilderness when they come across an abandoned camp. An elderly Cree seer woman appears, who warns that they must kill a boy to prevent one sister from killing the other.  As the sisters depart, unseen creatures track them and start howling, and their startled horse runs off. In the chaos ensuing, a Cree man (known as "The Hunter") saves and leads them to Fort Bailey, where they take refuge. Ginger explains to the fort's residents they are the daughters of a drowned trader and are seeking passage east.

The creatures are revealed as werewolves, which have besieged the fort for some time. Murphy, the fort's physician, inspects Brigitte’s wound and applies a leech, surreptitiously testing for werewolf infection. They are given a room that belonged to Wallace's son. Awakened by a voice, Ginger investigates the corridors, where she eventually finds the source: a deformed boy kept in a small, bolted unlit room; he bites her shoulder as he flees.

When Ginger and Brigitte attempt to leave, James, the fort's leader, confronts them. While Ginger and James are fighting, werewolves attack, killing one of the residents. Reverend Gilbert, suspicious of the sisters' intentions, leads them to an allegedly safe building, which actually contains a werewolf. The werewolf attacks the sisters, but The Hunter appears and kills it. As Ginger and Brigitte are going to their room, Ginger's nose starts to bleed, a sign that she is infected.

The sisters discover the boy who bit Ginger is Wallace's son, Geoffrey. As Ginger sleeps, he sneaks into the bedroom and wakes her. She tries to grab him, but he gets away. Geoffrey accidentally kills a man named Seamus who investigates the noise he makes, and Ginger is framed for his murder. Brigitte is held captive by James as Ginger is taken away to test for lycanthropy. Wallace arrives to find James threatening to rape Brigitte. He dismisses James, and makes a deal with Brigitte: her sister's life in exchange for the sisters' silence regarding his son. Wallace and Brigitte find Ginger at the doctor's, strapped to the examination table and held at gunpoint, about to be tested with a leech. When Wallace demands they release Ginger, Murphy ignores the order. Wallace shoots him dead, which prompts the other men to leave.

Determined to kill Geoffrey, Ginger finds him mourning at his mother's grave. He tries to escape but is captured instead by the men, alerting them to the deception. Wallace arrives and kills his son himself. The sisters' protection at an end, Ginger is forced to leave, and Brigitte goes with her. Desperate for a cure, the sisters go to The Hunter's cave.

At the cave, The Hunter and elderly Cree seer reveal the sisters' coming had long been prophesied and that the Red and the Black would decide the destiny of the werewolf bloodline. Brigitte enters a trance-like state and has a vision of her destiny – The Hunter attempts to kill Ginger, but Brigitte kills her sister herself. As Brigitte emerges from the trance, she finds the seer is dead, killed by Ginger, who has fled. The Hunter offers to help Brigitte find Ginger but deceives her, leading her back to the fort.

Arriving at the fort, Brigitte is taken prisoner. Gilbert tells her to beg forgiveness to save her soul, but Brigitte rejects him. He drags her out onto the parade square and prepares to burn her alive but is interrupted by Wallace, who kills him. James engages Ginger in a fight, and she slashes his throat. Ginger opens the gates and ushers in the werewolves who chase down and maul the last of the fort's residents. Wallace is soon bitten and sets the fort on fire before killing himself. The Hunter urges Brigitte to kill her sister; instead, she kills him and flees with Ginger.

The prophecy broken, Brigitte and Ginger decide to run away together and vow to protect each other.  Brigitte then holds out her hand and presses a cut on it against a cut on Ginger's hand, mixing their blood and infecting herself.

Cast
 Katharine Isabelle as Ginger Fitzgerald
 Emily Perkins as Brigitte Fitzgerald
 Nathaniel Arcand as The Hunter
 JR Bourne as James
 Hugh Dillon as Reverend Gilbert
 Adrien Dorval as Seamus
 Brendan Fletcher as Finn
 David La Haye as Claude
 Tom McCamus as Wallace Rowlands
 Matthew Walker as Doc Murphy
 Fabian Bird as Milo
 Kirk Jarrett as Owen
 David MacInnis as Cormac
 Stevie Mitchell as Geoffrey

Production
Ginger Snaps Back: The Beginning was shot back-to-back with Ginger Snaps 2: Unleashed.

Release
The film premiered at the Fantasia International Film Festival on 10 July 2004. After the disappointment of the second film's theatrical run, Ginger Snaps Back: The Beginning was released direct-to-DVD. Lionsgate released it on 27 August in Canada and on 7 September in United States the same year.

Reception
Bloody Disgusting rated it 5/5 stars and said: "It surpasses its two predecessors by leaps and bounds". Joshua Siebalt of Dread Central rated it 2.5/5 and wrote that the film does not live up to the previous instalments of the series. Brett Cullum of DVD Verdict wrote: "It's not quite up to snuff with what came before, but it still takes Canadian horror above and beyond anything Hollywood has been cranking out lately".

Accolades

References

External links
 
 
 

2004 films
2004 drama films
2004 horror films
2000s English-language films
2000s Western (genre) horror films
Canadian Western (genre) horror films
Canadian drama films
Canadian teen films
Canadian werewolf films
Cree-language films
Direct-to-video prequel films
English-language Canadian films
Films about sisters
Films set in 1815
Films set in Canada
Films shot in Edmonton
Ginger Snaps films
Gothic horror films
Lionsgate films
2000s Canadian films
Canadian prequel films
Copperheart Entertainment films